Odoiporus is a genus of beetles belonging to the family Curculionidae.

The species of this genus are found in Southern Asia.

Species:

Odoiporus gages 
Odoiporus glabricollis 
Odoiporus glabridiscus 
Odoiporus longicollis 
Odoiporus major 
Odoiporus planipennis 
Odoiporus sulcicollis

References

Curculionidae
Curculionidae genera